De l’autre côté (English: From the Other Side) is a 2002 independent documentary art film directed by Chantal Akerman.

Reception

The film, which premiered at the 2002 Cannes Film Festival and was released on DVD in 2016 as part of a boxset also containing D'Est (1993), Sud (1999), and Down There (2006), looks at the fate of Mexicans who cross the border into the United States.

References

External links

 (Icarus Films's Channel) 

2002 documentary films
2002 independent films
2002 films
Australian documentary films
Australian independent films
Belgian documentary films
Belgian independent films
Documentary films about illegal immigration to the United States
Documentary films about Mexico
Films directed by Chantal Akerman
Finnish documentary films
French documentary films
French independent films
2000s French-language films
2000s Spanish-language films
2000s English-language films
2000s French films